is the title of thirty Japanese fictional short stories which focus on a group of teenage girls attending three affiliated all-girl schools. A common theme throughout the stories are the intimate lesbian relationships between the characters. The stories, while written by Sakurako Kimino and illustrated by Chitose Maki, were the product of a reader participation game run by MediaWorks in the bishōjo magazine Dengeki G's Magazine. The game started in the January 2004 issue of the magazine and concluded in the February 2005 issue; this resulted in twenty-five short stories (except for the first) which had been directly influenced by reader participation votes in ten separate rounds of voting. The short stories later spawned many other adaptations in the Strawberry Panic! series, including an anime, manga, and light novel series.

The first three stories appeared in the February 2004 issue of the magazine which was released on December 30, 2003. Three more were published each month up to May 30, 2004, which at the time meant that eighteen stories had been published. This was the completion of the first story arc entitled the Etoile Chapter. The next story arc entitled the Dormitory Panic Chapter comprised seven stories in greater length than the earlier stories. These seven stories were published between June 30 and December 30, 2004, which corresponds to the August 2004 through February 2005 issues of Dengeki G's Magazine. This concluded the reader participation game at twenty-five stories.

After a three-month hiatus, more stories returned in the May 2005 issue of Dengeki G's Magazine on March 30, 2005. This small series of five separate stories was written as a supplementary bibliography of the twelve girls in the story. The series concluded in the September 2005 issue on July 30, 2005. None of the original thirty stories were ever published again in bound volumes.

Short stories list

Etoile Chapter

Dormitory Panic Chapter

Supplementary short stories

Voting results

Round 1 (March 2004 issue)

Round 2 (May 2004 issue)

Round 3 (July 2004 issue)

Round 4 (August 2004 issue)
Individual results were not given for the character rankings; there were 1034 votes total.

Round 5 (September 2004 issue)

Round 6 (October 2004 issue)

Round 7 (November 2004 issue)

Round 8 (December 2004 issue)

Round 9 (January 2005 issue)

Final round (February 2005 issue)

References

External links
Strawberry Panic! at MediaWorks 

Seinen manga
Short stories
Yuri (genre) anime and manga